
Namysłów County is a unit of territorial administration and local government (powiat) in Opole Voivodeship, south-western Poland. It came into being on January 1, 1999, as a result of the Polish local government reforms passed in 1998.

As of 2019 its total population is 42,692, out of which the population of Namysłów is 16,557 and the rural population is 27,400.

Neighbouring counties
Namysłów County is bordered by Kępno County to the north-east, Kluczbork County to the east, Opole County to the south, Brzeg County to the south-west, and Oława County and Oleśnica County to the west.

Administrative division
The county is subdivided into five gminas (one urban-rural and four rural). These are listed in the following table, in descending order of population.

References

External links
Portal Namyslowianie.pl Local News Service in Namyslow.

 
Land counties of Opole Voivodeship